is a Japanese anime television series produced by Liden Films. It aired between January 8 and March 25, 2016.

Plot
The series follows four Greco-Roman gypsum busts: Saint Giorgio, Medici, Hermes and Mars, who form an idol unit managed by Miki Ishimoto, a rookie art school graduate.

Characters

 (ep. 8)

References

External links
 

Anime with original screenplays
Liden Films